Bulbophyllum rubrolabellum is a species of plant in the family Orchidaceae that is endemic to Taiwan. It was first described scientifically in 1975 by Tsan Piao Lin in the journal Taiwania: Science Reports of the National Taiwan University, and is the basionym for its treatment by Ying as B. odoratissimum var. rubrolabellum (T.P.Lin) S.S.Ying in 1990.

References

External links 
Type specimen of B. rubrolabellum (collected from Mount Yangmei in Taiwan)

Orchids of Taiwan
Endemic flora of Taiwan
rubrolabellum
Endangered plants
Plants described in 1975
Taxonomy articles created by Polbot